Myloplus zorroi is a medium to large omnivorous fish of the family Serrasalmidae from Brazil.

Etymology
The fish is named in honor of Mauricio Camargo-Zorro, a researcher at the Instituto Federal de Educação, Ciência e Tecnologia in São Paulo.

References

Serrasalmidae
Freshwater fish of Brazil
Taxa named by Marcelo Costa Andrade
Taxa named by Michel Louis Arthur Marie Ange François Jégu
Taxa named by Tommaso Giarrizzo
Fish described in 2016